Germany participated in the 2010 Summer Youth Olympics in Singapore. The German squad consisted of 70 athletes competing in 20 sports: aquatics (swimming), archery, athletics, badminton, basketball, boxing, canoeing, fencing, gymnastics, judo, modern pentathlon, rowing, sailing, shooting, table tennis, taekwondo, tennis, triathlon, weightlifting and wrestling.

Medalists

Archery

Girls

Mixed Team

Athletics

Boys
Track and Road Events

Field Events

Girls
Track and Road Events

Field Events

Badminton

Girls

Basketball

Girls

Boxing

Boys

Canoeing

Boys

Girls

Diving

Boys

Girls

Fencing

Group Stage

Knock-Out Stage

Gymnastics

Artistic Gymnastics

Boys

Girls

Rhythmic Gymnastics 

Individual

Trampoline

Judo

Individual

Team

Modern pentathlon

Rowing

Sailing

One Person Dinghy

Shooting

Pistol

Rifle

Swimming

Boys

Girls

Mixed

 * raced in heats only

Table tennis

Individual

Taekwondo

Tennis

Singles

Doubles

Triathlon

Girls

Men's

Mixed

Weightlifting

Wrestling

Freestyle

References

External links
Competitors List: Germany

2010 in German sport
Nations at the 2010 Summer Youth Olympics
Germany at the Youth Olympics